Nagorny is an urban locality (an urban-type settlement) in Neryungrinsky District of the Sakha Republic, Russia, located  from Neryungri, the administrative center of the district, on the right bank of the Timpton River on the northern flank of the Stanovoy Highlands, only  from the border with Amur Oblast. As of the 2010 Census, its population was 68.

History
It was founded in the 1920s in conjunction with the construction of the road connecting the Aldan River region and Yakutsk with the Trans-Siberian Railway. In 1927, Nagorny became the administrative center of Timptonsky District and remained the most populous inhabited locality in southern Yakutia into the 1940s. In 1941, it was granted urban-type settlement status, although the district administration was moved to Chulman in 1943.

Nagorny received a second lease of life in the mid-1970s, with the construction of the Baikal–Amur Mainline branch railway from Tynda to Neryungri.

With the completion of the railway and in the absence of any other economic development, the majority of the local population left again during the 1980s and 1990s. The remaining population is concentrated in the original settlement. Nagorny is planned to be entirely depopulated in the near future.

Administrative and municipal status
Within the framework of administrative divisions, the urban-type settlement of Nagorny is incorporated within Neryungrinsky District as the Settlement of Nagorny. As a municipal division, the territories of the Settlement of Nagorny and the Settlement of Zolotinka are incorporated within Neryungrinsky Municipal District as Zolotinka Urban Settlement.

Transportation
Nagorny is served by the nearby Nagornaya–Yakutskaya railway station on the Amur–Yakutsk Mainline. It is also on the A360 Lena Highway, the main road to Yakutsk.

Climate
Nagorny has a monsoonal subarctic climate (Dwc).

References

Notes

Sources
Official website of the Sakha Republic. Registry of the Administrative-Territorial Divisions of the Sakha Republic. Neryungrinsky District. 

Urban-type settlements in the Sakha Republic